Joseph Goto (1916–1994) was an American sculptor, best known for his abstract-expressionist welded steel sculptures. He was born in Hilo, Hawaii, and learned welding in the United States Army during the Second World War. In the late 1940s, Goto studied sculpture at the Art Institute of Chicago. He taught at Brandeis University, Carnegie Mellon University, the Rhode Island School of Design, and the University of Michigan.

Goto's sculptures range from table-top size to large scale public works. No. 24 in the collection of the Honolulu Museum of Art is typical of his small-scale works. The Art Institute of Chicago, the Butler Institute of American Art (Youngstown, OH), the Honolulu Museum of Art, the Kresge Art Museum (East Lansing), the Museum of Modern Art (New York), the Nelson-Atkins Museum of Art (Kansas City, MO), and the Rhode Island School of Design are among the public collections holding works by Joseph Goto.

https://www.josephgoto.org/
https://www.instagram.com/josephgoto_/

References
 Haar, Francis, Artists of Hawaii: Volume Two, University of Hawaii Press, Honolulu, 1977, pp. 14–18

Footnotes

External links
 Joseph Goto in AskArt.com

Sculptors from Hawaii
1916 births
1994 deaths
School of the Art Institute of Chicago alumni
Rhode Island School of Design faculty
Brandeis University faculty
Carnegie Mellon University faculty
University of Michigan faculty
United States Army personnel of World War II